Chaganti Vari Palem is a village having a population of around 5,000 people and is situated (16.323447°N 80.098994°E) around 10 km away from the Capital city of Palnadu district, of southern state Andhra Pradesh of India.

Transport 

Chaganti Vari Palem is situated at the midway of Narasaraopet and Sattenapalli at a distance of 10 km away from both of them.

Nearest Railway Station 

Though Narasaraopet also has a railway station, Sattenapalli is the preferable railway station as there are several trains through Sattenapalli to reach most of South India (Hyderabad, Visakhapatnam, Chennai, Tirupathi, Cochi, Trivandrum) and few places like Bhubaneswar, Mumbai, Surat etc.

Nearest Airport

Vijayawada_Airport at Gannavaram

Nearby villages

Muppalla, Dammalapadu, Thurakapalem, Rama Krishna Puram,
Gollapadu, 
L. Kurapadu, 
Madala, 
Narnepadu, 
Bollavaram, 
Kunduru Vari Palem, 
Palu Devarla Padu

Temples

1. Lingamayya Swamy Temple

2. Sai Baba Temple

3. Brahmam gari Matham

4. Sri Jagannadha Swamy Devasthanam (www.srijagannadhaswamydevasthanam.com)

Notable people from the village 
Brahmanandam

External links 

  Pragathi Welfare Society
 ACO (Adopt Child Online)

Villages in Guntur district